The 1916 AAA Championship Car season consisted of 15 races, beginning in Brooklyn, New York on May 13 and concluding in Los Angeles, California on November 30.  There were also 12 non-championship races.  The AAA National Champion and Indianapolis 500 winner was Dario Resta.

Schedule and results

 Reduced from 500 to 300 miles due to the onset of World War I.
 Sanctioned by the Automobile Club of America, AAA awarded points.
 Shared drive.

Leading National Championship standings

General references

See also
1916 Indianapolis 500
1916 American Grand Prize

AAA Championship Car season
AAA Championship Car
1916 AAA Championship car season
1916 in American motorsport